In mathematical representation theory, the Hecke algebra of a pair (g,K) is an algebra with an approximate identity, whose approximately unital modules are the same as K-finite representations of the pairs (g,K). Here K is a compact subgroup of a Lie group with Lie algebra g.

Definition

The Hecke algebra of a pair (g,K) is the algebra of K-finite distributions on G with support in K, with the product given by convolution.

References

Representation theory